The Dean of Wells is the head of the Chapter of Wells Cathedral in the Mendip district of Somerset, England. The dean's residence is The Dean's Lodging, 25 The Liberty, Wells.

List of deans

High Medieval
1140–1164: Ivo
1164–1189: Richard of Spaxton
1190–1213: Alexander
1213–1216: Leonius
1216–1219: Ralph of Lechlade
1219–1236: Peter of Chichester
1236–1241: William of Merton
1241–1253: John Saracenus
1254–1256: Giles of Bridport
1256–1284: Edward of Cnoll
1284–1292: Thomas Bytton
1292–1295: William Burnell
1295–1302: Walter Haselshaw

Late Medieval
1302–1305: Henry Husee
1305–1333: John Godelee
1333–1333: Richard of Bury
1334–1335: Wibert of Littleton
1335–1349: Walter of London
1349–1350: Thomas Fastolf
1350–1361: John of Carleton
1361–1379: Stephen Penpel
1379–1381: John Fordham
1381–1396: Thomas Thebaud (of Sudbury)
1397–1398: Henry Beaufort
1398–1401: Nicholas Slake

1401–1410: Thomas Tuttebury
1410–1413: Richard Courtenay
1413–1413: Thomas Karneka
1413–1423: Walter Medeford
1423–1424: John Stafford
1425–1446: John Forest
1446–1467: Nicholas Carent
1467–1472: William Witham
1472–1498: John Gunthorpe

Early modern
1498–1525: William Cosyn
1525–1529: Thomas Wynter (also Archdeacon of York, Archdeacon of Richmond (1526–1529), Archdeacon of Suffolk (1526–1529) and Archdeacon of Norfolk (from 1529))
1529–1537: Richard Woleman
1537–1540: Thomas Cromwell
1540–1547: William Fitzwilliam (or Fitzjames)
1548–1550: John Goodman (deprived)
1551–1554: William Turner (deprived)
1554–1561:  John Goodman (reinstated)
1561–1568: William Turner (restored)
1570–1573: Robert Weston
1574–1589: Valentine Dale
1590–1602: John Herbert
1602–1607: Benjamin Heydon
1607–1621: Richard Meredith
1621–1631: Ralph Barlow

1631–1641: George Warburton
1642–1644: Walter Ralegh
1660–1670: Robert Creighton
1670–1704: Ralph Bathurst
1704–1713: William Grahme (or Graham)
1713–1733: Matthew Brailsford
1733–1736: Isaac Maddox
1736–1738: John Harris
1739–1766: Samuel Creswicke
1766–1799: Lord Francis Seymour

Late modern
1799–1812: George Lukin
1812–1831: Hon Henry Ryder
1831–1845: Edmund Goodenough
1845–1854: Richard Jenkyns
1854–1881: George Johnson
1881–1891: Edward Plumptre
1891–1911: Thomas Jex-Blake
1911–1933: Armitage Robinson
1933–1950: Richard Malden
1951–1958: Frederic Harton
1958–1962: Christopher Woodforde
1962–1973: Irven Edwards
1973–1989: Patrick Mitchell
1990–2003: Richard Lewis
200431 December 2015 (ret.): John Clarke
31 December 201520 November 2016: Andrew Featherstone (Acting)
20 November 20166 January 2023 (ret.): John Davies

References

Further reading
Robinson, J. A., The First Deans of Wells (1921)

Church of England deans
 
Dean of Wells